Carex testacea, the orange New Zealand sedge, is a species of flowering plant in the family Cyperaceae, native to New Zealand. Prized for its colourful foliage, which provides both summer and winter interest, it is widely available commercially.

References

testacea
Ornamental plants
Endemic flora of New Zealand
Plants described in 1853